Thomas Joseph "Tom" Masiello is a retired United States Air Force Major General who served as the eighth commander of the US Air Force Research Laboratory. He is a member of the Society of Experimental Test Pilots.

Career
Masiello was commissioned in 1981 as a distinguished graduate of the United States Air Force Academy. A command pilot, he has logged more than 3,300 flying hours in more than 20 different aircraft. He has served as an experimental test pilot and test squadron commander conducting developmental flight tests on a wide variety of weapon systems. He has been Director of the Munitions Directorate at the Air Force Research Laboratory, Wing Commander of a classified unit, and the Command Inspector General for Air Force Materiel Command.

Masiello has held other operational and staff assignments, including a tour as Deputy Chief of Staff, United States Central Command, where he spent the bulk of his tour at CENTCOM's Forward Headquarters in Southwest Asia; and Deputy Director for Operations — Operations Team Two, National Military Command Center, Joint Staff, The Pentagon, Washington, D.C. He has served as Deputy Director, Strategic Effects, U.S. Forces - Iraq, Baghdad, Iraq, and Deputy Assistant Secretary for Plans, Programs and Operations, Bureau of Political-Military Affairs, U.S. Department of State.

Major General Thomas Masiello is married to Wendy Lee Motlong Masiello, who is an Air Force Lieutenant General. The couple has two sons, who are also in the Air Force.

Education
1981 Distinguished graduate, Bachelor of Science degree in electrical engineering, U.S. Air Force Academy, Colorado Springs, Colorado
1986 Distinguished graduate, Fighter Weapons Instructor Course, Nellis Air Force Base, Nevada
1987 Distinguished graduate, Squadron Officer School, Maxwell Air Force Base, Alabama
1990 Distinguished graduate, U.S. Air Force Test Pilot School, Edwards Air Force Base, California
1990 Master of Science degree in aeronautical science, Embry–Riddle Aeronautical University
1991 Distinguished graduate, Air Command and Staff College, Maxwell Air Force Base, Alabama
1995 Advanced Program Management Course, Defense Systems Management College, Fort Belvoir, Virginia
1999 Distinguished graduate, master's degree in national resource strategy, Industrial College of the Armed Forces, Fort Lesley J. McNair, Washington, D.C.
2005 General Management Program, Harvard Business School, Cambridge, Massachusetts
2007 Joint and Combined Warfighting School, Joint Forces Staff College, Norfolk, Virginia

Assignments
June 1981 - May 1982, student, undergraduate pilot training, Williams Air Force Base, Arizona
April 1983 - September 1987, F-111F instructor pilot; Chief of Weapons and Tactics, 492d Tactical Fighter Squadron, Royal Air Force Lakenheath, England
October 1987 - December 1989, F-111 operational test and evaluation instructor pilot, 431st Test and Evaluation Squadron, McClellan Air Force Base, California
January 1990 - September 1990, student, USAF Test Pilot School, Edwards Air Force Base, California
October 1990 - July 1993, F-15A, F-15E and F-111 experimental test pilot, 3247th Test Squadron, and Flight Commander, 40th Flight Test Squadron, Eglin Air Force Base, Florida
August 1993 - June 1994, student, Air Command and Staff College, Maxwell Air Force Base, Alabama
July 1994 - August 1996, F-16 program element monitor, Deputy Chief of Staff for Plans and Programs, Headquarters U.S. Air Force, Washington, D.C.
September 1996 - July 1998, operations officer and F-16 experimental test pilot, 39th Flight Test Squadron, Eglin Air Force Base, Florida
August 1998 - June 1999, student, Industrial College of the Armed Forces, Fort Lesley J. McNair, Washington D.C.
July 1999 - June 2000, commander, 40th Flight Test Squadron, Eglin Air Force Base, Florida
July 2000 - May 2002, commander, Eglin Research Site, and Director, Munitions Directorate, Air Force Research Laboratory, Eglin Air Force Base, Florida
May 2002 - March 2004, Wing Commander, classified unit
March 2004 - July 2005, Command Inspector General, Air Force Materiel Command, Wright-Patterson Air Force Base, Ohio
July 2005 - June 2007, Deputy Chief of Staff, U.S. Central Command, MacDill Air Force Base, Florida  (October 2005 - March 2006 and October 2006 - December 2006, Forward Headquarters, USCENTCOM, Southwest Asia)
June 2007 - January 2009, Deputy Director for Operations — Operations Team Two (J3), National Military Command Center, Joint Staff, the Pentagon, Washington, D.C.
January 2009 - January 2010, Deputy Director, Strategic Effects (CJ9), U.S. Forces-Iraq, Baghdad, Iraq
March 2010 - April 2011, Deputy Assistant Secretary for Plans, Programs and Operations, Bureau of Political-Military Affairs, U.S. Department of State, Washington, D.C.
May 2011 – July 2013, Director of Special Programs, Office of the Under Secretary of Defense for Acquisition, Technology and Logistics, the Pentagon, Washington, D.C.
August 2013 - May 2016, commander, Air Force Research Laboratory, Wright-Patterson Air Force Base, Ohio

Flight information
Rating: Command pilot
Flight hours: 3,300
Aircraft flown: More than 20 different types including the F-15, F-15E, F-16, F-111, C-12 and HH-60

Awards and decorations

Effective dates of promotion

References

Year of birth missing (living people)
Living people
United States Air Force officers
United States Air Force Academy alumni
Recipients of the Legion of Merit
Harvard Business School alumni
Air Force Research Laboratory people